Leticia Francisca Torres Mandiola (born 30 May 1994) is a Chilean footballer who plays for Boldklubben af 1893. She was captain of the U17 team, who was the first team to qualify to a World Cup in 2010. She was captain on the U20 teams in 2012 and 2014 and was part of the full team that participated in the Copa America in 2014.

References

1994 births
Living people
Chilean women's footballers
Women's association football defenders
San Francisco Dons women's soccer players
Chile women's international footballers
Competitors at the 2014 South American Games
South American Games silver medalists for Chile
South American Games medalists in football
Chilean expatriate women's footballers
Chilean expatriate sportspeople in the United States
Expatriate women's soccer players in the United States